Canton of Marseille-Belsunce is a former canton located within the commune of Marseille, Bouches-du-Rhône department, France. It was created 27 February 2003 by the decree 2003-156 of that date. It was disbanded following the French canton reorganisation which came into effect in March 2015. Its population was 28,724 in 2012.

Elected to represent the canton in the General Council of Bouches-du-Rhône'' : 
 Fortuné Sportiello (PS, 2001-2008)

Area
It is composed of the part of the 1st arrondissement of Marseille not included in the cantons of Marseille-Les Grands-Carmes and Marseille-Les Cinq-Avenues as well as the remaining part of the 7th arrondissement of Marseille not included in the canton of Marseille - Saint-Lambert.

See also 
 Arrondissement of Marseille
 Cantons of the Bouches-du-Rhône department
 Communes of the Bouches-du-Rhône department

References

Former cantons of Marseille
Marseille-Belsunce
2015 disestablishments in France
States and territories disestablished in 2015
2003 establishments in France